An artist's impression, artist's conception, artist's interpretation, or artist's rendition is the representation of an object or a scene created by an artist when no other accurate representation is available. It could be an image, a sound, a video or a model. Artist's impressions are often created to represent concepts and objects that cannot be seen by the naked eye; that are very big, very small, in the past, in the future, fictional, or otherwise abstract. For example, in architecture, artists' impressions are used to showcase the design of planned buildings and associated landscape. Artists' impressions are particularly prominent in space art.

See also
Architectural rendering
Concept art

References

Art
Articles containing video clips